Mario Eduardo Testino Silva OBE  HonFRPS (born 30 October 1954) is a Peruvian fashion and portrait photographer.

His work has featured internationally in magazines such as Vogue, V Magazine, Vanity Fair and GQ. He has also created images for brands such as Gucci, Burberry, Versace, Michael Kors, Chanel, Stuart Weitzman, Carolina Herrera and Estée Lauder. Alongside his practice as a photographer, Testino has also worked as a creative director, guest editor, museum founder, art collector and collaborator and entrepreneur.

Aaron Hicklin of The Observer described him as "the world's most prolific magazine and fashion trade photographer".

Early life
Testino was born and grew up in Lima into a well-to-do Roman Catholic family. He was the eldest of six children and is of Spanish, Italian, and Irish descent. He attended a Catholic school, Santa Maria Marianistas. As a child he wanted to be a priest.

Testino studied economics at La Universidad del Pacífico followed by the Pontificia Universidad Catolica del Peru and the University of San Diego.

In 1976, he went to London to study photography after abandoning his studies of Economics, Law and International Affairs. It was during apprenticeships at the studios of John Vickers and Paul Nugent that he made his first attempts as a photographer. Living in a humble shared house that had been converted from a hospital, without much money, he funded himself by working as a waiter. He had his hair dyed pink which helped him get noticed as a photographer and took inspiration from British celebrity fashion photographer Cecil Beaton. London was a city that allowed him to flourish expressively without the restrictions he felt were imposed on him in Peru.

His work first appeared in Vogue in 1983.

During the early 1990s, Testino looked to his childhood growing up in Peru and his teenage summers in Brazil for inspiration, which helped him to shape his photographic language.

Career
Testino has become one of the world's best-known and most celebrated fashion photographers. He has documented subjects from A-list stars, musicians, supermodels and artists as well as subjects he has encountered throughout his travels. His work has been featured in magazines such as Vogue, V Magazine, Vanity Fair, GQ, LOVE, Allure and VMan. Eighteen exhibitions and more than 16 books have been published on his work. Suzy Menkes, Vogue's International Editor explains, "Testino's skill is first and foremost to catch the moment and to bring out the humanity in his subjects".

Some of Testino's most recognizable work derives from his portraits of royals, most famously, his series with Diana, Princess of Wales in 1997. Commissioned for Vanity Fair he said: "[Diana] opened a door for me because I then started photographing the royal families of Europe extensively ... this brings out my love for tradition, for a way of showing family and the longevity of people". Testino was also the official photographer for portraits of the Duke and Duchess of Cambridge on the occasion of their engagement in December 2010. In July 2015, he took the official photographs of the British royal family after Princess Charlotte of Cambridge's christening at Sandringham Estate. He has photographed many other royal families in a similar fashion.

Testino's collaboration with Tom Ford and fashion stylist Carine Roitfeld on provocative advertising campaigns in the mid-1990s is widely credited to have led to the revival of Gucci as a major fashion house.

Anna Wintour, editor-in-chief of American Vogue stated that "Fashion photography is this uneasy mix of art and commerce and I think nobody understands this better than Mario".

Aaron Hicklin of The Observer described him as "the world's most prolific magazine and fashion trade photographer". His persistence in shooting Gisele Bündchen and Kate Moss is widely credited with elevating their supermodel status. Testino started the ‘Towel Series’ on his Instagram account in 2013, featuring influential people, including musicians, actors and models wearing only towels. The series became widely replicated by his followers on the social platform and highly in demand among celebrities.

Testino was nicknamed the "John Singer Sargent of our times" by Terence Pepper, photography curator at the National Portrait Gallery in London. The Gallery's 2002 Portraits exhibition attracted more visitors than any other show in the museum's history at the time. For ten years it had the highest attendance of any exhibition ever to be held there. Over the next four years the exhibition toured globally. Testino’s work has been exhibited in museums around the world, including the Helmut Newton Foundation in Berlin (Undressed, 2017) the Shanghai Art Museum (Private View, 2012) and the National Portrait Gallery in London (Portraits, 2002)

More than 17 books of his photography have been published, including Ciao, Sir, MaRIO DE JANEIRO Testino, and Kate Moss by Mario Testino, all published by TASCHEN; as well as Alta Moda and Pasito a Paso, published by Museo MATE

Testino's personal art collection has been the subject of two exhibitions. The first, Somos Libres in 2013 was at MATE - Museo Mario Testino in Lima, Peru. The second installation in 2014, Somos Libres II took place at the Pinacoteca Giovanni e Marella Agnelli in Turin, Italy. His relationship with fine art developed through frequent visits to galleries and artists studios, and he has collaborated to create works with artists such as Keith Haring, Vik Muniz, John Currin and Julian Schnabel.

Testino was presented with an honorary OBE on 14 January 2014 by UK Culture Minister Ed Vaizey in recognition of his career and charity work.

In 2011, he was awarded an Honorary Fellowship by The Royal Photographic Society. These are awarded to distinguished persons having, from their position or attainments, an intimate connection with the science or fine art of photography or the application thereof. In this same year GQ also awarded Testino the Man of the Year Inspiration Award.

In Latin America, he has been awarded The Grand Cross rank of the Order of Merit for Distinguished Service in Peru (25 May 2010) and The Tiradentes Medal in Brazil (2007).

Within the fashion and entertainment industry, he received the Walpole Ward for services to the luxury industry (2009), the Rodeo Drive Walk of Style Award (2005) and the British Style Award (2003).

To raise awareness of the value and beauty of cultural heritage all around the world, Testino has launched his most ambitious project yet: "A Beautiful World". The new body of work shines a unique spotlight onto the rich cultural heritage of traditional communities and people around the world.

Selected clients
Allure, Burberry, Calvin Klein, Carolina Herrera, Roberto Cavalli, Chanel, Cîroc, Dolce & Gabbana, Estée Lauder, Etro, Fabergé, Ferragamo, Furla, Gap, GQ, Gucci, Givenchy, Harper's Bazaar, Hugo Boss, Iguatemi, Lancôme, Loewe, The Macallan, Massimo Dutti, Mercedes Benz, Michael Kors, Missoni, Ochirly, Ralph Lauren, Revlon, Stefanel, St John, Stuart Weitzman, Shiseido, Shanghai Tang, Sonia Rykiel, Tod's, Trussardi, V Magazine, Valentino, Vanity Fair, Versace, VMAN, Vogue (American, Brazilian, British, Chinese, Dutch, French, German, Italian, Japanese, Russian and Spanish editions), Wolford.

Works and exhibitions
See: List of works and exhibitions by Mario Testino

Sexual harassment accusations
In January 2018, The New York Times published an article in which Testino was accused by 13 male assistants and models who worked with him of sexual harassment. Models Roman Barrett, Jason Fedele and Ryan Locke complained about his behaviour during campaigns in the 1990s. Subsequent to the allegations (which extended to photographer Bruce Weber's conduct) Condé Nast announced they "will not be commissioning any new work with them for the foreseeable future."

Further allegations were reported by The New York Times against Testino in 3 March 2018. Four of the five new allegations described their incidents occurring during or after 2010. Testino has denied all allegations. The total number of people publicly accusing Testino of sexual assault rose to 18.

Philanthropy
Testino has been honoured for his contributions to many non-profit causes and charitable organizations through various awards and recognitions. In 2010, he was appointed one of the highest honours in his native country, The Grand Cross Order of Merit in Peru, and became President of the Board of World Monuments Fund Peru in 2014.

In his role as a Save the Children ambassador he helped to raise funds to build the El Salvador Clinic in the Pueblo Nuevo District, Chincha in his native Peru. The clinic was built for children with tuberculosis in the area badly affected by the devastating earthquake, which hit the coast of Peru in August 2007. The El Salvador Clinic was entirely funded from the sale of a single print from his portraits of Princess Diana, auctioned for £100,000.

He helped to raise funds for Natalia Vodianova's Naked Heart Foundation to build a playground in a Moscow children’s hospital specializing in cancer. It is a cause close to his heart since his brother died from the disease at the age of 10.

In July 2013, Testino opened his first non-profit association in Barranco, Lima. Museo Mario Testino was established to act as a dynamic platform for Peruvian art through the cultivation and promotion of culture and heritage.

Testino restored a 13,000 sq. ft. mansion built in 1898, which is home to a permanent exhibition of his work alongside a temporary exhibition space for Peruvian and international artists.

Recognition and awards

References

External links

 
 

1954 births
Fashion photographers
Honorary Officers of the Order of the British Empire
Living people
People from Lima
Peruvian expatriates in England
Peruvian people of Irish descent
Peruvian people of Italian descent
Peruvian photographers
University of the Pacific (Peru) alumni
Peruvian LGBT people
Chevaliers of the Légion d'honneur